My Brother the Cow is the fourth studio album by the American grunge band Mudhoney. It was released on Reprise Records on March 28, 1995 (see 1995 in music). My Brother the Cow includes numerous direct references to bands that influenced Mudhoney's sound. The song "F.D.K. (Fearless Doctor Killers)", for example, is a reference to the Bad Brains song "F.V.K. (Fearless Vampire Killers)". "Orange Ball-Peen Hammer" alludes to the song "Orange Claw Hammer" by Captain Beefheart, as well as containing lyrics borrowed from Led Zeppelin. "1995" is homage to the song "1969" by The Stooges, and also includes musical references to "L.A. Blues", another Stooges song.

The original CD release includes a 34-minute hidden track named "woC eht rehtorB yM", which consists of most of the album's preceding songs played backwards. Reprise re-issued the album in 2003 with bonus tracks.  Tracks 13–18 of this edition were originally on a 7" single included with the vinyl LP of the album.  "Not Goin' Down That Road Again" was originally the B-side of the "Generation Spokesmodel" 7" single, and is also included on March to Fuzz. The song "Into Yer Shtik" received some backlash for the band as Courtney Love thought it was about her in the wake of Kurt Cobain's death. About a month before the release of the album and on Mark Arm's 33rd birthday, head of Reprise called the band's A&R rep Dave Katznelson saying he never wanted to see or speak to the band ever again. Due to grunge's decrease in popularity at this point, the record only sold around 40,000 copies on its initial release.

Track listing
 "Judgement, Rage, Retribution and Thyme" – 2:34
 "Generation Spokesmodel" – 2:33
 "What Moves the Heart?" – 3:12
 "Today, Is a Good Day" – 3:05
 "Into Yer Shtik" – 3:48
 "In My Finest Suit" – 4:57
 "F.D.K. (Fearless Doctor Killers)" – 2:16
 "Orange Ball-Peen Hammer" – 3:21
 "Crankcase Blues" – 3:06
 "Execution Style" – 2:24
 "Dissolve" – 3:17
 "1995" – 5:43
 "woC eht rehtorB yM" (hidden track) – 33:42

Re-issue track listing
 "Judgement, Rage, Retribution & Thyme" – 2:34
 "Generation Spokesmodel" – 2:33
 "What Moves the Heart?" – 3:12
 "Today, Is a Good Day" – 3:05
 "Into Yer Shtik" – 3:48
 "In My Finest Suit" – 4:57
 "F.D.K. (Fearless Doctor Killers)" – 2:16
 "Orange Ball-Peen Hammer" – 3:21
 "Crankcase Blues" – 3:06
 "Execution Style" – 2:24
 "Dissolve" – 3:17
 "1995" – 5:43
 "Mudhoney Funky Butt" – 1:24
 "West Seattle Hardcore" – 0:50
 "Sissy Bar" – 1:06
 "Carjack '94" – 1:16
 "Sailor" – 0:25
 "Small Animals" – 1:17
 "Not Goin' Down That Road Again" – 3:41

Personnel

Mudhoney
Mark Arm – vocals, electric guitar
Matt Lukin – bass guitar
Dan Peters – drums, marimba
Steve Turner – electric guitar

Additional musicians
 E.J. Renestair – tenor sax
 Jon Wahl – harmonica

Technical personnel
Jack Endino – production

Charts

References

Mudhoney albums
1995 albums
Reprise Records albums
Albums produced by Jack Endino